The General in Red Robes (hangul - Hongui janggun) is a 1973 South Korean film directed by Lee Doo-yong. It was awarded Best Film at the Grand Bell Awards ceremony.

Plot
In this historical drama set during the Imjin War, Kwak Jae-Wu leads an army against the Japanese invaders. Once he and his soldiers have helped defeat the Japanese, Kwak refuses a government post as reward from the Royal Court, and chooses instead to live the rest of his life in Bipa Mountain.

Cast
Hwang Hae
Ko Eun-ah
Do Kum-bong
Lee Kang-jo
Kim Young-in
An Gil-won
Han Tae-il
Yu Il-su
Kim Mu-yeong
Cheon Bong-hak
Shin Goo

Bibliography

References

External links

1973 films
Best Picture Grand Bell Award winners
1970s Korean-language films
South Korean drama films
Films directed by Lee Doo-yong